Snushanerne is a 1936 Danish film directed by Lau Lauritzen Jr. and Alice O'Fredericks.

Cast
 Per Gundmann
 Kai Holm
 Arthur Jensen
 Sigurd Langberg
 Lau Lauritzen, Jr.
 Connie Meiling
 Carl Viggo Meincke
 Carola Merrild
 Palle Reenberg
 Eigil Reimers
 Ib Schønberg - Peter Basse

References

External links

1936 films
1930s Danish-language films
Danish black-and-white films
Films directed by Lau Lauritzen Jr.
Films directed by Alice O'Fredericks